The 1844 New Jersey gubernatorial election was held on October 8, 1844. Whig nominee Charles C. Stratton defeated Democratic nominee John Renshaw Thomson with 50.94% of the vote.

This was the first election held under the New Jersey Constitution of 1844, which was adopted on June 29 and reformed the state government, notably establishing an independent executive branch. Before 1844, New Jersey Governors were elected by a majority of the General Assembly and held office as a member of that body. Although the new constitution formally lifted the constitutional property requirement for suffrage, it added race and sex requirements; only white males over the age of 21 were eligible to vote in this election.

General election

Candidates
Charles C. Stratton, former U.S. Representative from Swedesboro (Whig)
John Renshaw Thomson, businessman and delegate to the 1844 Constitutional Convention from Princeton (Democratic)

Results

References

1844
New Jersey
1844 New Jersey elections
October 1844 events